Moschino is an Italian luxury fashion house founded in 1983 by Franco Moschino in Milan known for over-the-top, campy designs. The company specializes in ready-to-wear, handbags, and fashion accessories.

History

Founding and 1990s
Franco Moschino was born February 27, 1950, and raised in Abbiategrasso, Italy. Moschino studied at Accademia di Belle in Milan from 1968 to 1971, at the dismay of his father, who hoped Franco would continue his family's work in the iron industry. While a student, Franco freelanced designs and illustrations for magazines and fashion houses. Upon graduation, Franco worked as a design sketcher for Versace from 1971 to 1977 and designed for Italian fashion house Cadette until 1982. The following year, Franco created "Moschino Couture!", owned by Moonshadow, its Milan-based holding company. Franco gained a reputation for implementing innovative, colorful, and witty designs into his apparel, such incorporating a  Roy Lichtenstein pop art piece in a suit and designing a t-shirt featuring a TV tuned to “Channel No. 5" (sparking a lawsuit by Chanel due to the reference to its Chanel No. 5 perfume).

By the late 1980s, Moschino's popularity in Europe had begun to replicate in the United States, with US sales accounting for 15 to 20 percent of business. By the 1990s, Franco became known for his social awareness campaigns and his criticism of the fashion industry. In 1994, Franco expressed desire to develop an ecological line “Nature Friendly Garment”,  however Franco died later that year from HIV/AIDS-related causes. In recent times, Moschino has made an effort to combat the HIV/AIDS epidemic through a partnership with Product Red and Nickelodeon, creating a Moschino x SpongeBob collection, bringing awareness to HIV/AIDS and fundraising by donating the collection's proceeds to Project Red.

Rossella Jardini, 1994–2013
After Franco's death in 1994, his friend Rossella Jardini became the brand's creative director. Responsible for the brand's image and style, Jardini's whimsical designs fit in nicely with the brand's established eccentricity. While Jardini was creative director, Moschino created outfits and accessories for artists Madonna and Lady Gaga for their world tours and created the opening ceremony outfits for the 2006 Winter Olympics. In 2009, Moschino opened its hotel concept, Maison Moschino.

In 1999, Moschino joined Aeffe S.p.A., an Italian group.

With the F/W 2008–2009 pre-collection, Moschino Jeans changed its name to Love Moschino.

Jeremy Scott, 2013–2023 

In October 2013, Jeremy Scott became Moschino's creative director, debuting his first collection in Fall 2014. Starting in 2014 under Scott's direction, Moschino Cheap and Chic was consolidated into a new women's line—"Boutique Moschino"—established to target a wider array of costumers, with a price-point about 40 percent lower than Moschino's mainline.

In 2014, Jeremy Scott designed a smiley face themed outfit for Katy Perry's world tour and in 2015 designed a black one-piece outfit with Swarovski crystals for Madonna's world tour.

In April 2018, Moschino announced a collaboration with H&M. The following year, Moschino collaborated with EA Games for a Sims 4 collection. The collection featured clothing with pixelated illusions inspired by the computer game.

With the 2019 Met Gala's theme Camp: Notes on Fashion, Katy Perry wore a gown that looked like a chandelier, created by Moschino, and Kacey Musgraves arrived appearing like a life-size Barbie, also by Moschino.

In 2021, Aeffe S.p.A. gained full control of Moschino, by acquiring the remaining 30 percent stake it did not originally own, at the price of 66.6 million euros ($78.51 million).

In March 2023, Jeremy Scott announced his exit from the creative director position.

Controversy
In a 2015 lawsuit, New York-based graffiti artist Rime claimed the Moschino dress worn by Katy Perry at the 2015 Met Gala copied his work. The case was settled in 2016.

In 2016, Nordstrom responded to pressure from consumers and pulled Moschino's pill-themed merchandise from its shelves, amid allegations it trivialized the opioid epidemic.

References

Clothing brands of Italy
Perfume houses
High fashion brands
Watch manufacturing companies of Italy
Luxury brands
Clothing companies established in 1983
Italian companies established in 1983
Companies based in Milan